Get In is the second and final studio album by the British alternative rock band Kenickie.  It was released on 25 August 1998 and reached number thirty-two on the UK Albums Chart. Get In includes the singles "I Would Fix You" and "Stay in the Sun".

Production and release
The album was produced by Adrian Bushby and band-member Peter Gofton, except "I Would Fix You" which was produced by Adrian Bushby and Peter Gofton with Andy Carpenter. Having been moved from the closed EMI subsidiary EMIdisc, the album was first released on CD and Cassette by the parent label. The album was re-released in February 2012 by Eastworld with seven bonus tracks. The artwork was designed by Nick Edwards.

Critical reception
The album received generally positive reviews from both UK weekly music newspapers. Melody Maker awarded the album 8/10  while the NME wrote: "This is the sound of a band refusing to play the game set out for them – attractive blonde singer, chirpy attitude, ladders to the top – risking a slide down the snakes instead ... the exuberant, lip-glossed evil of ‘Punka’ has been replaced by the maturity shorthand of strings and synths, flamenco flamboyance kicking up alongside deadpan electro, Shangrai-La’s drumbeats booming next to high-kicking pastiche. It’s often audaciously bleak ... but they aren’t stupid enough to go to the other Svengali-approved extreme and dress up as tragic divas. If it’s messy, it’s because the situation described in ‘I Would Fix You’ is messy; if it’s brave, it’s never foolish."

Broadsheet newspaper the Daily Telegraph also praised the album: "The foursome from Sunderland ..., hitherto known for their bouncy but rather lightweight guitar-dominated pop ditties, have done a Supergrass and made a glorious second album that manages to be both enormously sophisticated and utterly fresh. What, exactly, is it about Get In that makes it so good? First, it manages to incorporate a huge variety of genres, from the Motown-meets-disco of Stay In The Sun to the electronically-driven groove of Sixties Bitch, while always retaining its essential Kenickie-ness. Second, it features some quite gorgeous multi-layered backing vocals, over which the voice of lead singer and guitarist Lauren Laverne drifts dreamily, covering a range of emotions from sweet vulnerability to sneering defiance (although her attempt at jazz crooning on the big-band finale, Something's Got To Give, is not terribly convincing). Third, and most crucially, it bulges with terrific tunes; if forced to pick the best, I'd choose the glorious Psychic Defence, which has a plaintive chorus and an exquisite key change, but there are plenty more which are almost as good. This, in short, is the sound of a band growing up and making proper music without losing any of their saucy-wit or their sense of fun."

Track listing

Personnel
Kenickie
Lauren Laverne
Marie du Santiago
Emmy-Kate Montrose
Pete Gofton

Other personnel
Becky Doe, Olli Kraus, Ruth Gottlieb and Sophie Sirota - String Quartet
Adrian Bushby - Producer and Mixing
Pete Gofton - Producer and Mixing
Andy Carpenter - Producer and Mixing ("I Would Fix You")
David Whittaker - Strings (1, 6, 8, 9, 12)
Ruth Gottlieb - Strings ("I Would Fix You")
Nick Edwards - Artwork

B-sides
from "I Would Fix You"
 "Rough Boys and Modern Girls"
 "Packed In"
 "I Would Fix You (Mint Royale Remix)"
 "I Would Fix You (DJ Downfall mix)"

from "Stay in the Sun"
 "Hooray For Everything"
 "Save Your Kisses for Me" (Brotherhood of Man cover)
 "Stay in the Sun (Fridge Remix)"
 "Stay in the Sun (Maxwell Implosion Influenza remix)"
 "Stay in the Sun (Club Mix)" (Remixed by Xenomania)
 "Stay in the Sun (Club Instrumental)" (Remixed by Xenomania)
 "Stay in the Sun (Bangkok Ladyboy Mix)" (Remixed by Kat People)
 "Stay in the Sun (Bangkok Ladyboy Instrumental)" (Remixed by Kat People)

The main single version of "Stay In The Sun" is also a different mix to the album version, with prominent additional percussion and piano parts.

Notes

References

External links

Get In at YouTube (streamed copy where licensed)

Kenickie albums
1998 albums
EMI Records albums